Konstantinos Spetsiotis (1883 – March 5, 1966) was a Greek track and field athlete who competed mainly in the 1500 metre walk.

He competed for Greece in the 1906 Intercalated Games held in Athens, Greece in the 1500 metre walk where he won the bronze medal.

References 
 list of Greek athletes

1883 births
1966 deaths
Greek male racewalkers
Olympic athletes of Greece
Olympic bronze medalists for Greece
Medalists at the 1906 Intercalated Games
Athletes (track and field) at the 1906 Intercalated Games